Zubair or Zubayr may refer to:

Places
Al-Zubair District, a district in Basra Governorate, Iraq
Az Zubayr, the capital of Al-Zubair District
Az Zubair Field, oilfield
Deim Zubeir, a town in Lol State, South Sudan
Zubair Group, a group of volcanic islands belonging to Yemen

People
Zubair (name), a given name and surname Includes a list of people with the names
Zubairi, a family name in South Asia and the Middle East

See also
Al-Zubayr (disambiguation)